Papa Ibou Kébé (born 10 December 1989) is a French footballer who plays as a forward for V.League 1 side SHB Da Nang.

Career

Papa Ibou Kébé started his senior career with ASPV Strasbourg in 2010. In 2019, he signed for Hanoi in the Vietnamese V.League 1, where he has made thirteen appearances and scored two goals in the 2019 season. Before that, he played for French clubs Colmar, Mulhouse and Le Mans, Cypriot club Anagennisi Deryneia, and Slovenian club Tabor Sežana.

In Season 2018-2019 Papa Ibou Kébé got Slovenian Second League Top Scorer with 24 goals for Tabor Sežana.

In July 2019, Vietnamese giant club Hanoi FC signed Kébé as a injury replacement of Ganiyu Oseni and played remaining half season of V.League and AFC Cup. It was an impressive season for Kebe as Hanoi won the League, Vietnamese National Football Cup and reached semi final of AFC Cup. On 30 October 2019, Ibou Kebe scored 1 goal and gave an assist in the Final of Vietnamese Cup against Quảng Nam. Hanoi won Vietnamese cup and Kebe was awarded with man of the match for his splendid performance. In 2020, Hanoi played Vietnamese National Football Super Cup against Ho Chi Minh City and won 2-1.

In 2020, Kebe signed with another Vietnamese club Quảng Nam for one season on loan from Hanoi.

Honours

Club
Anagennisi Deryneia
Cypriot Second Division:
 Runners-up : 2017–18

Tabor Sežana
Slovenian Second League:
 Runners-up : 2018–19

Hanoi FC
V.League 1: 
 Winners : 2019
Vietnamese National Cup: 
 Winners :      2019
Vietnamese Super Cup: 
 Winners :      2019

References

External links 
 Papa Ibou Kébé on  Soccerway 

1989 births
Living people
Footballers from Strasbourg
Black French sportspeople
French footballers
Association football forwards
French expatriate footballers
ASPV Strasbourg players
SR Colmar players
FC Mulhouse players
Le Mans FC players
Anagennisi Deryneia FC players
Hanoi FC players
Slovenian Second League players
V.League 1 players
Expatriate footballers in Cyprus
Expatriate footballers in Slovenia
Expatriate footballers in Vietnam
French expatriate sportspeople in Cyprus
French expatriate sportspeople in Slovenia
French expatriate sportspeople in Vietnam